Gibi or gibi- is a binary prefix.

Gibi may also refer to:

Gibi, a Brazilian Portuguese term for Brazilian comics
Gibi ASMR (born 1994), American ASMR performer
Gibi District, Liberia
Gibi Mountain Formation, clastic sedimentary rocks in Liberia
Gibi National Forest, Liberia

See also
Hebén, a grape variety descended from the North African Gibi table grape
Tom Gibis (born 1964), American voice actor